Kerala does not recognise same-sex marriages or civil unions. In January 2020, a same-sex couple, Sonu Soman and Nikesh Pushkaran from the Ernakulam district, filed a writ petition with the Kerala High Court to legalise same-sex marriage.

Legal history

Background
Marriage in India is governed under several federal laws. These laws allow for the solemnisation of marriages according to different religions. Every citizen has the right to choose which law will apply to them based on their community or religion. These laws are the Hindu Marriage Act, 1955, which governs matters of marriage, separation and divorce for Hindus according to Hindu custom and rites, the Indian Christian Marriage Act, 1872, which regulates the marriage and divorce of Christians, the Muslim Personal Law (Shariat) Application Act, 1937, for matters concerning the marriage, succession and inheritance of Muslims, the Parsi Marriage and Divorce Act, 1936, concerning the marriage and divorce of Parsis, the Anand Marriage Act, 1909, concerning the marriage of Sikhs, and the Special Marriage Act, 1954 (SMA). The SMA allows all Indian citizens to marry regardless of the religion of either party. Marriages contracted under the SMA are registered with the state as a civil contract. The Act applies to partners of all religions or with no religious beliefs as well as to interfaith couples. None of these acts explicitly bans same-sex marriage.

On 14 February 2006, the Supreme Court of India ruled in Smt. Seema v. Ashwani Kumar that the states and union territories are obliged to register all marriages performed under the federal laws. The court's ruling was expected to reduce instances of child marriages, bigamy, cases of domestic violence and unlawful abandonment. Subsequently, the Government of Kerala, by order of Governor R. L. Bhatia, published the Kerala Registration of Marriages (Common) Rules, 2008 in the Kerala Gazette on 29 February 2008. The Rules provide for the registration of all marriages "solemnized in the State after the commencement of these Rules [...] irrespective of [the] religion of the parties". They created a Registrar of Marriages, which shall issue a marriage certificate upon reception of a memorandum of marriage filed by the spouses. The Registrar may refuse to issue the license if the parties fail to meet the requirements to marry under the national law of their religion or community. The marriage certificate requires the name, nationality, age, date of birth, address, and the previous marital status of the "husband" and the "wife".

2020 writ petition
In January 2020, Sonu Soman, an IP professional, and Nikesh Pushkaran, a businessman, filed a writ petition in the Kerala High Court, arguing that preventing them from marrying under the SMA violates the principle of equality, non-arbitrariness, non-discrimination, individual dignity and personal autonomy under Articles 14, 15(1), 19(1)(a) and 21 of the Constitution of India. The couple, from the Ernakulam district, had sought to marry at the Guruvayur Temple, but authorities refused to solemnize the marriage and issue a certificate; they married in a secret ceremony in a car parking area of the temple in July 2018. They cite the Supreme Court's ruling in Navtej Singh Johar v. Union of India, which decriminalized homosexuality in India in 2018 and recognized a person's right to be treated with dignity regardless of sexual orientation, whilst arguing that exclusion from the institution of marriage denies them basic rights and privileges such as maintenance, inheritance, pension, joint bank accounts, etc: "The institution of marriage affords certain rights and privileges to the persons in matrimony in the society and due to the aforesaid exclusion, the homosexual couples like the petitioners are denied an opportunity to enjoy similar rights and privileges. Being married carries along with it the right to maintenance, right of inheritance, a right to own joint bank accounts, lockers; nominate each other as a nominee in insurance, pension, gratuity papers etc. All these are unavailable to the Petitioners due to their exclusion from the institution of marriage, making the said exclusion more discriminatory." The couple filed the writ on 24 January with Justice Anu Sivaraman.

As of October 2022, the Kerala Government had not yet filed a response to the writ petition. Soman and Pushkaran wrote to Chief Minister Pinarayi Vijayan, but likewise did not receive a response. In November 2022, the Deputy Solicitor General announced that the government was taking steps to get the writ petition transferred to the Supreme Court of India.

Live-in relationship cases

Sreeja S v. Commissioner of Police

In 2018, the Kerala High Court ruled that a lesbian couple, Sreeja and Aruna, did not violate the law by living together in a same-sex relationship. The couple had moved in together, but Aruna's parents filed a missing person complaint with the police, and later attempted to send her to a mental hospital in Thiruvananthapuram. During the court proceedings, Aruna clarified that she was living with Sreeja of her own free will. The court held that their live-in relationship did not violate the law, and ordered that the couple be allowed to freely reside together.

Adhila Nasarin v. Commissioner of Police
In May 2022, the Kerala High Court gave a Muslim lesbian couple, Fathima Noora and Adhila Nasarin, the right to live together. The couple had been forcibly separated by their families, with Noora allegedly being forced into conversion therapy. Nasarin filed a habeas corpus plea, Adhila Nasarin v. Commissioner of Police, stating "Noora's mother came and showed me a petition saying that I kidnapped her and she will take her back. They are very cruel, they may try to kill her and there were several threats from Noora's family. They even threatened to kill me and my father. Noora was taken away from me by force." In a short proceeding before Justices K. Vinod Chandran and C. Jayachandran, the court issued a judgement in favour of the couple on 31 May. The couple were married in a traditional ceremony in October 2022.

Devu G v. State of Kerala

In 2022, a woman from Kaloor filed a habeas corpus plea, alleging that her same-sex partner had been illegally detained by her parents. The couple had been together for a year and planned on getting married. On 2 February 2023, the High Court denied the plea and directed the detained partner to attend psychiatric counselling. On 6 February, the plaintiff filed for review with the Indian Supreme Court. In her petition, she stated that the counselling recommended by the High Court "is obviously counselling to change her sexual orientation.", and urged her partner's release.

Non-legally recognised marriage ceremonies
Some same-sex couples have married in traditional marriage ceremonies, though the marriages have no legal status in Kerala. Sonu Soman and Nikesh Pushkaran were married in Guruvayur in July 2018, and in January 2020 filed a writ petition to have their marriage legally recognized. Nived Antony Chullickal and Abdul Rahim were the second couple from Kerala to make public the news of their marriage. "I really just wanted to get married to my boyfriend and shared pre-wedding photoshoot, firstly, as a message to everyone that it is better to be late than never and second, it is so good to come out and marry your partner. Our wedding was like any other wedding. I also wanted it to be an inspiration for people, so that they too can do the same, and now so many people have called me and I really feel good that I have been an inspiration for all.", Chullickal told The News Minute. The couple, originally from Kerala, were married in Bangalore, Karnataka in December 2019.

Public opinion
In a survey conducted by India Today in 2019, 58% of participants from the state opposed same-sex relationships; the 4th highest among the 12 states surveyed.

The 2021 Mathrubhumi Youth Manifesto Survey conducted on people aged between 15 and 35 showed that 74.3% of respondents supported legalising same-sex marriage, while 25.7% were opposed.

See also
LGBT rights in Kerala
Recognition of same-sex unions in India
Supriyo v. Union Of India

Notes

References

Kerala
Politics of Kerala